James Braddell  is an English musician and film maker, who uses the stage name of Funki Porcini. "Funki Porcini" is a twist on "Funghi Porcini", the Italian name of the mushroom Boletus edulis, commonly known as "penny bun".

He spent ten years in Italy making music for film and television. Thereafter, he returned to England. In 1994, he signed to independent record label Ninja Tune and set up his own studio, The Uterus Goldmine.

He has also recorded as a member of 9 Lazy 9 (a.k.a. 8 Lazy Bastards), under the pseudonym Giacomo Braddellini; and released the EP "Float On" (1995), as a member of short-lived band Purr, along with DJ N4Eric (a.k.a. Toona) and Stuart Warren-Hill of Hexstatic.

Discography
 Hed Phone Sex (1995, Ninja Tune)
 Love, Pussycats and Carwrecks (1996, Ninja Tune)
 The Ultimately Empty Million Pounds (1999, Ninja Tune)
 Fast Asleep (2002, Ninja Tune)
 Plod (2009, Independent)
 On (2010, Ninja Tune)
 One Day (2011, Independent)
  Le Banquet Cassio (2013, Independent)
 Conservative Apocalypse (2016)
 The Mulberry Files (2018, Independent)
 Studio 59 (2019, Independent)
 Boredom Never Looked So Good (2020, Independent)
 Motorway (2020, Independent)
 Drift To This (2021, Independent)
 Where the Sauce is Deluxe (2022, Independent)

References

External links
 

English DJs
English electronic musicians
English filmmakers
English male composers
English record producers
Ninja Tune artists
Third Mind Records artists
1962 births
Living people
British trip hop musicians
Downtempo musicians
Electronic dance music DJs
Musicians from London